The coat of arms of Moscow depicts a horseman with a spear in his hand slaying a basilisk and is identified with Saint George and the Dragon. The heraldic emblem of Moscow has been an integral part of the coat of arms of Russia since the 16th century.

Kievan Rus
Yaroslav the Wise (died 1054) was the ruler of Kievan Rus with an image of Saint George on his seal. Saint George was his personal patron saint; he was baptised George. Saint George was also the patron saint of Yaroslav's great-grandson, Yury Dolgoruky, who  - according to tradition - founded the city of Moscow shortly before his death in 1157. (The name "Yury" is a Russian-language equivalent of "George".)

A century later, Alexander Nevsky (lived 1221-1263) resumed this usage. Several of his coins depict a horseman slaying a basilisk or a dragon, though the beast is not always visible. 
Alexander's motivation for reverting to Mstislav's emblem is disputed. It is possible that the image referred to his own victories over the Swedish and German crusaders in the Battle of the Neva (1240) and the Battle of the Ice (1242).

Muscovite Russia
Alexander's great-grandson, Ivan II, was the first ruler of Moscow to employ as his emblem the standing warrior with a sword in his hand. Ivan's son Dmitry Donskoy chose to represent this warrior riding a horse with a spear in his hand. Historians traditionally connect Dmitry's symbol with his victory over the Mongols in the Battle of Kulikovo, although historical clues are scarce. At about the same time, a similar symbol, the Vytis, emerged as a state emblem in the rival Grand Duchy of Lithuania. 

The symbol of the horseman  passed down through the generations: from Dmitry to his son Vasily I, then to Vasily II and Ivan III. A coin which featured the image became known as kopeck, from kopyo, the Russian word for "spear".

Imperial Russia

At first the charging horseman was interpreted as showing the figure of the ruling tsar slaying an enemy intruding into the Russian lands. This attitude was clearly expressed by the Muscovite statesman Grigory Kotoshikhin, among others. On the title page of the 1663 Bible, the heraldic horseman appears to have the face of Tsar Alexis.

20th century

After the Russian Revolution, the heraldic symbols of the Russian Empire were banned. On September 22, 1924, the Moscow Soviet adopted a new emblem of Moscow which features a red star, the sickle and hammer symbol, and the monument of the Soviet Constitution (the statue of liberty). On the red scroll it says: Московский совет рабочих крестьянских и красноармейских депутатов (Moscow council of the deputies of the workers, the peasants, and the Red Army). The new emblem failed to gain popularity and was rarely used. After the dissolution of the Soviet Union, the heraldic representation of Moscow reverted in 1993 to the version used between 1883 and 1918, with some minor modifications.

As the Russian Orthodox Church does not allow sculptural representations of saints, no statues of Saint George and the Dragon were erected in Moscow prior to the Revolution. After the emblem was restored on November 23, 1993, a cluster of statues on the subject were unveiled in Poklonnaya Gora, Tsvetnoi Boulevard, Manege Square, and other places in Moscow. Most of these were sculpted by Zurab Tsereteli, who also had other versions of the subject installed in such cities as New York City.

Notes and References

External links

 Coat of arms of Moscow: History and pictures
 Coat of arms of Moscow: History and pictures

Culture in Moscow
History of Moscow
Moscow
Horses in art
Moscow
Moscow
Moscow
Saint George and the Dragon